Graphium xenocles, the great zebra, is a swallowtail butterfly found in Southeast Asia which is common and not threatened.

Description
Male upperside: black forewing with the following greenish or bluish-white streaks and spots: Cell with three transverse, very oblique, broad streaks and two elongate spots near apex; in the type as described the outer two of the three streaks coalescent; broad streaks from base in interspaces la to 3; a series of four rounded spots beyond apex of coll in interspaces 4, 5, 6 and 8, followed by five short streaks that are outwardly truncate or emarginate, in interspaces 4 to 8; lastly, a complete subterminal series of comparatively large rounded spots. Hindwing with similar greenish-white or bluish-white streaks and spots as follows: a broad curved streak in cell; broad streaks from base in interspaces 1 to 7, these streaks vary in length but invariably leave a comparatively broad margin of the ground colour beyond; the streak in interface 7 white, that in interspace 1, and in some specimens in interspace 2 also, with a large yellow spot beyond the apex; lastly, a subterminal series of spots, some or all of which may be absent, but when present the posterior three always somewhat lunular. Underside: fuliginous brown, paler towards the apical area of forewing; markings as on the upperside, but duller and less clearly defined. Antennae, head, thorax and abdomen black; two spots on the head, the thorax and abdomen laterally, white; beneath: the thorax and abdomen white, the latter with a medial and a lateral narrow stripe.

Female similar to the male with similar markings; those on the hindwing often vary in width more than they do in the males; the ground colour also of the hindwing is generally of a chestnut red, not black or fuliginous.

See also

Papilionidae
List of butterflies of India
List of butterflies of India (Papilionidae)

References

Pathysa
Butterflies of Asia
Taxa named by Pieter Cramer
Butterflies described in 1775